Sgurr nan Coireachan (953 m) is a mountain in the Northwest Highlands of Scotland. It lies in the Lochaber region, near the head of the remote Glen Dessarry.

A steep mountain with a mixture of rocky and grassy slopes, it is often climbed as part of the Sgurr na Ciche ridge. Climbs usually start from Loch Arkaig to the east.

References

Marilyns of Scotland
Munros
Mountains and hills of the Northwest Highlands